Teresa Victoria Carpio (born  5th April 1981) is an American actress and singer. She is best known for her breakthrough role as Prudence in the film Across the Universe (2007), in which she sang the Beatles song "I Want to Hold Your Hand". She gained further recognition for playing Valerie in Limitless (2011) and Shelby Prince in the Lifetime television series The Client List (2013).

She is also known for her starring roles in theatre, including Arachne in the original Broadway production of Spider-Man: Turn Off the Dark (2011) and Eurydice in the Citadel Theatre production of Hadestown (2017).

Early life
Teresa Victoria Carpio was born in April 1981 in Oklahoma City, Oklahoma. She is the daughter of Hong Kong singer Teresa Carpio, with whom she has performed on stage as a guest singer, including at the Hong Kong Philharmonic Orchestra. Her father was Peter Mui, a fashion designer who founded YellowMan, a successful tattoo clothing brand, and co-founded Tungtex Holdings Co., a Hong Kong-based garment maker.

Carpio spent much of her childhood at an international school in Hong Kong and then, at the age of 11, moved to Springfield, Missouri. When she was 14, Carpio moved to New York. Carpio initially was an ice skater and planned on pursuing that as a career to become an Olympic ice skater but she was injured and realized as a teenager that she was not good enough. Carpio studied jazz vocals for two years at The New School.

Career 
After realizing that she could no longer pursue ice skating, Carpio began her career as a dancer. She danced with NSYNC at the 2000 MTV Video Music Awards, performed on Last Call with Carson Daly, and danced in music videos for Bruce Springsteen and Whitney Houston. In 2001, Carpio was a contestant on The WB television show Popstars, alongside Nicole Scherzinger, but did not win.

She made her television debut portraying a laundry lady in Law & Order (2002) and later appeared in one episode of The Jury (2004). Carpio portrayed Gail in She Hate Me (2004) and had her first major role as Angela Tsing in Sucker Free City (2004), both films directed by Spike Lee. Carpio made her Broadway debut in Rent as Alexi Darling and others, from December 2006 until April 2007.

Carpio decided to move to Los Angeles to pursue her acting career. Carpio's breakthrough came when she played Prudence, a cheerleader in love with another female cheerleader but the love is unrequited, in the film Across the Universe (2007), in which she sang a rendition of the Beatles song "I Want to Hold Your Hand", directed by Julie Taymor. Carpio's father, Peter Mui, appeared in the film as an extra in the role of a prankster.

From 2010 to 2011, she starred in the Broadway musical Spider-Man: Turn Off the Dark, directed by Julie Taymor, with whom Carpio had worked a few years earlier. Previews began on November 28, 2010, where she originally played one of the Greek narrators, Miss Arrow. Due to the departure of original Arachne actress Natalie Mendoza, Carpio officially replaced her in the role on January 4, 2011, after covering multiple times during Mendoza's absence. During revisions, Carpio's role was decreased extensively as the creative team and many critics believed the villainess was not working for the show. Carpio suffered a neck injury during a performance in March 2011. She made a full recovery and returned to the show over two weeks later. During this time Carpio made her major film debut in Limitless (2011), alongside Bradley Cooper, which premiered in March of that year. After delays, Spider-Man officially opened on June 14, 2011. Carpio departed the show on November 13, 2011.

Carpio has continued making various acting appearances on television, in films, and on stage. Most notably, Carpio had a recurring role as Shelby Prince in the Lifetime series The Client List (2013), portrayed Satomi in The Scribbler (2014), and starred as Eurydice alongside Reeve Carney in Hadestown (2017) at the Citadel Theatre. She then portrayed Sophie, a deaf woman, in the short film Noise (2018) which debuted in October 2018 at the Austin Film Festival and was released online on September 13, 2019, on Omeleto. In 2019, Carpio performed in the ensemble of Little Shop of Horrors at the Pasadena Playhouse.

Personal life 
Carpio is married to Cato Herring, a DJ. They have two children together, one daughter and one son, and live in California.

Filmography

Film

Television

Theatre

Awards and nominations

References

External links

1981 births
20th-century American actresses
21st-century American actresses
American people of Hong Kong descent
American women singers
American film actresses
American stage actresses
American musicians of Chinese descent
American musicians of Filipino descent
American television actresses
The New School alumni
Living people
American female dancers
Singers from Oklahoma
Singers from New York City
Singers from Missouri
Hong Kong singers
English-language singers from Hong Kong
Hong Kong child singers
American actresses of Chinese descent
Musicians from Oklahoma City
American musical theatre actresses
Actresses from Oklahoma City